Iris psammocola is a plant species in the genus Iris, it is also in the subgenus Iris and in the section Pseudoregelia.  It is a rhizomatous perennial, from China. It has grass-like leaves, short stems, yellow flowers.  It is cultivated as an ornamental plant in temperate regions.

Description
It has short, obconical (like an inverted cone) rhizomes, with slender secondary roots underneath. The top of the rhizome has dense straight fibres.

They have a pointed end.

The stem has 2 lanceolate and (scarious) membranous spathe (leaves of the flower bud). They have a distinct midvein.

The stems hold 1 terminal (top of stem) flower, blooming between April and May.

Like other irises, it has 2 pairs of petals, 3 large sepals (outer petals), known as the 'falls' and 3 inner, smaller petals (or tepals), known as the 'standards'.
In the centre of the petal is a beard.

It has 1.5 cm long stamens, and style branches that are 3.5 cm long.

After the iris has flowered, it produces an seed capsule which has not been described.

Biochemistry
As most irises are diploid, having two sets of chromosomes, this can be used to identify hybrids and classification of groupings.
Nothing has been reported currently as of August 2015, about a chromosome count of the iris.

Taxonomy
It is written as 沙生鸢尾 in Chinese script and known as sha sheng yuan wei in Pidgin.

It is commonly known in China as 'Sandy iris'.

The Latin specific epithet psammocola refers to an amalgamation of 2 Greek words.  'Psammo' – sand,
and 'cola' – living in.

It was originally collected in the desert dunes of Baijiatan (White House Beach), near the city of Lingwu, in Ningxia on the 10 April 1959.
 
It was first published and described by Yu Tang Zhao in 'Acta Phytotax. Sin.' Vol.30 Issue 2 on page 181 in 1992.

It was verified by United States Department of Agriculture and the Agricultural Research Service on 4 April 2003, then updated on 29 September 2008.

It is listed in the Encyclopedia of Life.

As of August 2015, Iris psammocola is not yet an accepted name by the RHS.

Distribution and habitat
It is native to temperate Asia.

Range
It is found in China, within the province of Ningxia.

geographic distribution	Asia – China – Ningxia Hui
Ningxia Dune Region, China

Habitat
It grows in the desert dunes.

Toxicity
Like many other irises, most parts of the plant are poisonous (rhizome and leaves), if mistakenly ingested can cause stomach pains and vomiting. Also handling the plant may cause a skin irritation or an allergic reaction.

References

Sources
 Wu Zheng-yi & P. H. Raven et al., eds. 1994–. Flora of China (English edition).
 Doronkin, V.M. & Shaulo, D.N. 2007, Iris psammocola (Iridaceae) a new species to the flora of Russia, Bot. Zhurn. 92(3): 435–439

External links

psammocola
Endemic flora of China
Flora of Ningxia
Garden plants of Asia
Plants described in 1992